The Chartered Institution of Highways and Transportation (formerly the Institution of Highways and Transportation) is a UK-based learned society (with worldwide membership) concerned specifically with the planning, design, construction, maintenance and operation of land-based transport systems and infrastructure.
 
With over 14,000 members, the CIHT offers routes to qualifications such as Chartered and Incorporated Engineer status and also Chartered transport planning professional. The CIHT is dedicated to providing support and networking opportunities to members with a calendar of technical seminars and conferences, plus social events. The CIHT has 12 regional UK branches and several overseas branches that all run local events and technical meetings.

The CIHT is a board-governed professional body. The main aims of the Council and Boards are to act as the decision-making bodies for the CIHT and deliver the strategy, business plans and outputs on behalf of the membership. The CIHT's Council and Boards were established to deliver the object of the Institution:

"to advance for the public benefit the science and art associated with highways and transportation in all their aspects; and to promote education, training, and research and development of the said science and art."

The CIHT is a member of the Construction Industry Council.

History and chartered status 
The history of the Institution of Highways and Transportation began in 1930 when it was simply called the Institution of Highway Engineers and more a gentleman's club than a qualifying body. The addition of 'transportation' to the functions of highway engineers emerged from the Buchanan Report, Traffic in Towns. The Institution did not take the name on board until the 1980s, when the Prime Minister, Margaret Thatcher, repealed local highway authorities' 40-year-old powers of direction over local planning authorities' powers to grant planning permission for property development, threatening the integrated land use, transport, and socio-economic development system that had been created after the Second World War.

Later (1992), the UK Government signed Agenda Item 21 of the Rio de Janeiro UN Summit Conference about integrating developmental and environmental considerations in planning, and a road traffic reduction private members bill attained Royal Assent in 1997. This was followed by a rehashing of the statutory development plan system in 2000 and the introduction of composite local service boards into the planning system in 2005 (including police, fire and rescue services, health and ambulance services, education and welfare services, and employment and housing services); planning applicants had to submit 'Access and Design Statements' with their planning applications demonstrating they had taken all highways and transportation considerations into account, and additional 'Transport Statements' if proposed developments exceeded particular thresholds. This spawned new interest in the design of public places to improve conditions for pedestrians and cyclists, and for users of public transport and car-sharing clubs, to curtail carbon emissions.

The organization was granted a royal charter on 7 December 2009 and changed its name to "Chartered Institution of Highways and Transportation".

Activities

Transport Advice Portal 
The Transport Advice Portal (TAP) website is a joint venture involving the Department for Transport (DfT) and the CIHT. TAP has been devised to direct members of the transportation profession and the general public to core documents in a range of subject areas that focus on the management of user groups on roads in the UK. The portal acts as a repository of web links to documents that are seen as key guides to the planning, design and operation of road networks.

CIHT Futures
CIHT FUTURES explores the implications of different scenarios for transport policy and practice.

Campaign for Safe Road Design
In July 2008 the IHT, as it then was, became a partner in the Campaign for Safe Road Design which called on the UK government to make safe road design a national transport priority.

Highways Sector Council
The Highways Sector Council, which includes the CIHT and several major highways contractors, was formed in late 2019, seeking to provide a single voice for the highways industry. In April 2020, the Institute of Highway Engineers, with six other organisations, formed the Highways Industry Alliance.

Post-nominal letters

References

External links
 CIHT home page
 TAP website
 List of UK Branches
 List of Overseas Branches

1930 establishments in the United Kingdom
ECUK Licensed Members
Engineering societies based in the United Kingdom
London Borough of Hackney
Organizations established in 1930
Road construction
Shoreditch
Transportation planning